Oswaldtwistle Rovers Football Club were a team based in the town of Oswaldtwistle, Lancashire. They first entered the FA Cup in 1884 and, in 1885, reached the second round. Rovers were one of the founder members of the Lancashire League in 1889, but predominantly competed in the Lancashire Combination between 1894 and 1909. In 1909, after leaving the second division of the Combination, they played their final game in the FA Cup.

History 

Oswaldtwistle Rovers were based in the town of Oswaldtwistle, near to Accrington, in Lancashire. Aside from friendly matches, they played in a number of competitions, including the FA Cup, the Lancashire League and the Lancashire Combination.

The first of their 22 appearances in the FA Cup came in the 1884–85 season, where they lost 12–0 to local side Blackburn Olympic in the first round. However, Olympic were a strong team who had won the cup in 1882–83 – the first time it had been won by a northern team. They fared better in 1885–86, beating Lower Darwen 3–1 in the first round. They were then paired against another local side, cup-holders Blackburn Rovers in the next round. They lost the game 1–0, with the goal scored by Hugh McIntyre; only a thousand spectators attended the game, which suggests that the two Rovers were not big rivals, despite their proximity. Blackburn Rovers went on to retain the cup that year.

Oswaldtwistle never again made it to the second round of the FA Cup. In the 1888–89 season, qualifying rounds were introduced for the first time. That year, Rovers entered at the second qualifying round, winning 3–1 at Blackburn Olympic, before losing to South Shore, who went on to become Blackpool F.C. In the same year, Rovers won the Lancashire Junior Cup. In February 1888, they also hosted Newton Heath – who would later change their name to Manchester United – in a friendly match that they won 6–0.

In 1889, Oswaldtwistle were one of the founder members of the Lancashire League. However, they struggled in that league, and left at the end of the 1890–91 season, having finished bottom of the table with only one win from 20 matches. In 1894 they entered the Lancashire Combination, a league generally populated by small local sides and the reserve teams of the larger Lancashire clubs. They ended the campaign in fourth place in the division, their highest ever league position. The team left the Combination in 1897, but returned three years later. They were then relegated to the Second Division of the Combination in 1904. Oswaldtwistle left the league at the end of the 1908–09 campaign, during which the side had conceded 137 goals.

Oswaldtwistle are not thought to have survived for long after leaving the league. Their last recorded games are in the 1909–10 FA Cup; paired against Dobson & Barlow's in the extra preliminary round, they drew 1–1 at home, before losing 2–0 away in the replay. Today the town of Oswaldtwistle, because of its location, is home to supporters of Blackburn Rovers and Accrington Stanley.

Colours

The Alcock yearbooks for 1886 to 1889 give the club's colours as red jerseys and white knickers.

Seasons 

Key: LL – Lancashire League; LC – Lancashire Combination; LCB – Lancashire Combination, B division; nR – nth round; nQ – nth round qualifying; PR – preliminary round; EPR – extra preliminary round.

Former players 

Former players who also played professionally in the English Football League include Tommy Becton, Martin Dunne, Proctor Hall, Kelly Houlker, Dick Lindley and George Parsonage.

References 

Defunct football clubs in England
Lancashire League (football)
Lancashire Combination
Defunct football clubs in Lancashire
Association football clubs established in 1884
Association football clubs disestablished in 1910